Robert Lopez is an American songwriter for musicals for the stage and screen.

He is best known for co-creating The Book of Mormon and Avenue Q, and for co-writing the songs featured in the Disney computer-animated films Frozen, its sequel, Frozen II, and Coco, with his wife Kristen Anderson-Lopez. Of only seventeen people who have won an Emmy, a Grammy, an Oscar and a Tony Award, nicknamed by Philip Michael Thomas in 1984 as the "EGOT", he is the youngest (at 39 years and 8 days old) and quickest (10 years) to win all four, and, as of 2022, is the only person to have won all four awards more than once—Emmy (4), Grammy (3), Oscar (2) and Tony (3).

Major associations

Academy Awards

Emmy Awards

Grammy Awards

Tony Awards

Industry awards

Annie Awards

Critics' Choice Awards

Drama Desk Awards
Source: Playbill Vault

Golden Globe Awards
Source: Golden Globes

See also 

 List of EGOT winners

References 

Lists of awards received by American musician